Nancy Khalaf (born 7 July 1974) is a Lebanese swimmer. She competed in two events at the 1988 Summer Olympics, coming in 50th and 56th.

References

External links
 

1974 births
Living people
Lebanese female swimmers
Olympic swimmers of Lebanon
Swimmers at the 1988 Summer Olympics
Place of birth missing (living people)